Owja Kolah (also Romanized as  Owjā Kolah; also known as Owjā Kolā and Ūjā Kolā) is a village in Kelarestaq-e Gharbi Rural District, in the Central District of Chalus County, Mazandaran Province, Iran. At the 2006 census, its population was 382, in 113 families.

References 

Populated places in Chalus County